Lasioglossum kandiense, also known as the Lasioglossum (Sudila) kandiense, is a species of bee in the family Halictidae.

References

Notes

kandiense
Insects described in 1913